Ojców  is a village in Gmina Skała, in Kraków County, Lesser Poland Voivodeship, in southern Poland. It is one of the sights of the Eagle Nests Trail (Szlak Orlich Gniazd), as there are the ruins of a gothic castle near the village. The village is where the authorities of the Ojców National Park (the smallest of Poland's 23 national parks) have their headquarters.

References

 
Villages in Kraków County